Minus six, −6, or –6 may refer to:
 Minus Six, an American pop rock group
 Minus six (exile), a Soviet punishment
 Dash 6, a de Havilland Canada aircraft

See also
 6 (number)
 Six (disambiguation)